The M-2 highway is a Montenegrin roadway.

The M-2 highway is the oldest and most important connection between the coastal region and the North of Montenegro. It goes from Petrovac na Moru in Budva Municipality, through the capital city of Podgorica, and the towns of Kolašin and Mojkovac, to the border of Serbia north of Bijelo Polje. In 2016, the highway was shortened, and its route changed. The road is considered to be the "backbone of the Montenegrin road network".

Most notorious part of this road is Platije Canyon, where more than 1200 people have lost their lives. Part of the Bar-Boljare motorway that was built from 2015 to 2022 is a new and safe connection between Podgorica and Kolašin avoiding Platije Canyon.

History
Construction of the historical M-2 highway began in 1953. Construction finished in 1971.

Part of M-2 highway, which was known as M-21 highway before January 2016, flowed through the center of the city of Bijelo Polje and caused heavy traffic delays. As a means to alleviate traffic in the city, the Montenegrin Ministry of Transport and Maritime Affairs commissioned a project to create a bypass around the city. As a result, on 27 March 2014, the Ministry of Transport and Maritime Affairs officially realigned the then M-21 highway to the  current alignment. The M-21 highway would now run along the bypass, no longer running through the city center.

In January 2016, the Ministry of Transport and Maritime Affairs published bylaw on the categorisation of state roads. With this new categorisation, M-2 highway was no longer following the coastal road, from the border with Croatia to Petrovac na Moru, which is now part of the newly established M-1 highway. In northern Montenegro, the M-2 was realigned from Ribarevine now going north via Bijelo Polje to the border with Serbia, instead of going via Berane and Rožaje to the border with Serbia, which is now the newly established M-5 highway.

Major intersections

References

M-2